Deltopia, originally known as Floatopia, is a social event started in 2004 which takes place annually in Isla Vista, California. Deltopia was originated by University of California, Santa Barbara students and occurs at the start of UCSB's spring quarter around Del Playa Drive. Participants consist primarily of college students. In early years, attendance was estimated at a few hundred participants with later years seeing an estimated 20,000 to 25,000 attendees.

The former title, "Floatopia", described the main activity the event was known for – floating on rafts and other floating devices along the Pacific coast in conjunction with a beach party. The event grew in attendance with an estimated 12,000 participants in 2009. Local authorities were not expecting a crowd of this magnitude, which left environmental destruction and numerous legal and medical cases in its wake. County officials took preventative measures to ensure similar parties didn't occur, and the legislation turned "Floatopia" into a terrestrial-based "Deltopia" block party for following iterations.

The popularity of Deltopia saw spin-off events created in San Diego, Miami Beach, Florida, and other locations across the world. Historically, the event has seen numerous arrests and injuries causing local authorities to allocate more resources in response. Environmental impacts have followed Deltopia and cleanup efforts have sprung up as a result, taking place after each event.

History

Early years of Floatopia 
Rumored to have begun in the early 1980s, Floatopia was started in 2004 by UC Santa Barbara students in Isla Vista. The event was originally titled "Floatopia", a portmanteau which referenced the flotation devices used by the attendees in the Pacific Ocean and the definition of "utopia". In addition to these floating parties, attendees also congregated at the beaches nearest Del Playa Drive.

In early years, Floatopia was patronized largely by local students from Santa Barbara City College and UC Santa Barbara and attracted hundreds of attendees. As word spread, attendance of Floatopia increased greatly, from an estimated 300 attendees in 2007 to an estimated 4,000 attendees in 2008.

Floatopia 2009 
Floatopia 2009, coinciding with the rise in usage of social media and social networking, had an event created and shared on Facebook to promote the event. As a result, an estimated crowd of 12,000 attendees descended to the Isla Vista beaches. The attendance caught local authorities off guard and outnumbered, resulting in chaos. A number of medical emergencies, citations, and arrests followed. The Santa Barbara County Sheriff's Office recognized the utilization of social networking and described the event as "... a public safety emergency and an environmental crisis ..." in their 2009 annual report.

Floatopia 2009's popularity resulted in plans for a "Floatopia 2" to occur in May 2009. Authorities, as well as some local students and residents, voiced their opinion against the sequel. The Santa Barbara County Board of Supervisors drafted emergency ordinances aimed at preventing Floatopia 2, resulting in a temporary 6 month alcohol ban at Isla Vista beaches. The restrictions, in addition to other factors such as the Jesusita Fire and environmental impact, resulted in Floatopia 2's failure to materialize.

Evolution into Deltopia and continued growth 
With the success of the restrictions put in place to prevent 2009's Floatopia 2, government officials made the temporary beach alcohol ban permanent in November 2009. Officials also contemplated restricting beach access, an idea later made official, to retard the growth of an impending Floatopia 2010. In response to the changes, attendees took to Del Playa Drive in block party fashion and renamed the event "Deltopia" after the street's name. The event drew a smaller crowd in 2010, estimated at 8,000 attendees. As officials placed restrictions on the event, attendees changed their plans and continued to grow the event with an estimated 8,000 to 10,000 attendees in 2012 and 15,000 to 18,000 in 2013.

Floatopia/Deltopia 2014
Authorities arrested about 100 attendees of Deltopia 2014. According to police, the party turned violent after some of the approximately 15,000 attendees objected to the arrest of a partygoer by the University of California Santa Barbara Police.

Resurgence in 2022
After a two-year hiatus due to restrictions stemming from the COVID-19 pandemic, Deltopia returned in Spring 2022. In response, local authorities declared the event a multi-casualty incident, which allowed authorities to triage emergencies from attendees and shift resources accordingly. Multiple arrests and medical emergencies occurred over the duration of the event.

Repercussions

Legal citations and accident reports 
Throughout Floatopia a number of accident reports and citations were issued. At the event 78 alcohol citations were issued and 13 arrests were made under the charges of drunk in public or disorderly conduct (throwing bottles from the bluffs towards the crowd below). Because of the large number of people concentrated in one area, most of whom were under the influence of alcohol, many injuries occurred. Two party goers were taken to the Cottage Hospital trauma center after falling from the cliffs and 33 people received treatment for head injuries, alcohol poisoning, and lacerations. The police also received a 9-1-1 call reporting a drowning person, but after they dispatched two engines and a truck to Del Playa and interviewed surrounding witnesses, no injury was actually apparent. The police stated a prevalent problem they encountered was attempting to determine which reports they received were valid.

Safety personnel 
During its peak hours, Floatopia was patrolled by a dozen Foot Patrol officers, Goleta deputies, and officers from the UCSB police department, 4 county fire engines, 2 ambulances, a search and rescue crew, and a helicopter. Lt. Brian Olmstead of the Isla Vista Foot Patrol stated that about 20 county firefighters were assigned to the event. The main problem was that Floatopia required so many officials to be present that it caused a redistribution of safety personnel. Olmstead stated,"this event had an impact on the county as a whole." The increased size of Floatopia caught emergency officials off guard and cost an estimated $20,000 in taxpayer money to patrol.

Environmental impact 
As attendees dispersed and debris remained, many people began to focus their attention on the aftermath of Floatopia. UCSB's Vice Chancellor of Student Affairs, Michael D. Young, sent out an email to UCSB students the first Wednesday following Floatopia regarding the event. Young expressed his concerns regarding the number of party goers who likely "urinate[d] in our ocean, destroy[ed] vegetation on the cliffs, drop[ped] broken glass and plastics of all shapes, sizes and varieties onto the sand and into the water, allow[ed] garbage to be strewn along the shoreline down to Santa Barbara and beyond, destroy[ed] habitat for any number of species, and kill[ed] untold numbers of fish and birds." Young concluded the letter asking students to "organize against the event" by discouraging potential participants and encouraging awareness.

In an effort to reduce the environmental impact of Floatopia, the Associated Students Environmental Affairs Board, Surfrider Foundation Isla Vista, and Coastal Fund organized beach cleanups. This is thought to have been relatively unsuccessful considering much of the debris was carried out to sea as a result of the high tide. After seeing the aftermath of Floatopia, Bradley Cardinale, a professor of ecology, revealed that even though he has "traveled all over the world for [his] research…, [he has] only seen dumping like this in third world countries." Cardinale urged students to consider "how much urine went into our coastal zone… You just don't clean that up. Sure we can pick up the beer cans, but the other stuff is out there permanently".

Sequels

Slotopia
Following Floatopia, a number of college students in the central coast hoped to continue the party 100 miles north, in San Luis Obispo. The event was dubbed "Slotopia." Ryan Magill, a senior at Cal Poly San Luis Obispo, created the "Slotopia" event on Facebook. The event was to take place at Shell Beach, an unincorporated community in Pismo Beach, on May 2, 2009. Initially, the event was sponsored by Obsession Entertainment. Obsession Entertainment agreed to shuttle students from Cal Poly to Shell Beach throughout the day, as a measure to prevent drinking and driving.

After the large number of injuries and citations and the excessive environmental pollution of Floatopia, the Pismo beach police, university officials, and a campaign led by a Cal Poly student named Ryan Featherson, all combined to stop the event. Ryan Featherson created his own event on Facebook entitled "Stop Slotopia." Once the event drew the negative attention of the media, Slotopia's sponsor, Obsession Entertainment, pulled out, along with the many deejays that were scheduled to play music that day. Unlike Floatopia, which took place on the beaches of Isla Vista, Slotopia was scheduled to occur at Shell Beach, which is not as heavily populated by college students. Shell Beach is a relatively small location in comparison to the beaches in Isla Vista, which could have potentially magnified the environmental impact and further upset the community of Shell Beach. The efforts to stop Slotopia were ultimately successful and Slotopia was cancelled. On May 2, 2009, Shell Beach had an unusually low number of college attendees for a weekend day.<ref>Nick Wilson, "Concerns cause organizers to cancel Slotopia party in Shell Beach" , San Luis Obispo Tribune, April 27, 2009</ref> The low attendance is largely attributable to the poor weather.

 In popular culture Deadline Hollywood'' reported in July 2021 that a movie starring Luna Blaise and Madison Pettis, with executive producer Olivia Newton-John, was in production and would be loosely based on the Deltopia 2014 events. Its announcement generated concern in the local community over the portrayal of Isla Vista.

See also
 Messabout
 Junk raft

References

Further reading
 
 
 
 
 

Social events
Santa Barbara, California
University of California, Santa Barbara
Traditions by university or college in the United States